Fernanda Russo (born October 2, 1999 in Córdoba) is an Argentine sport shooter. She won a silver medal in the air rifle at the 2015 Pan American Games, and also shared a runner-up prize with Mexico's José Santos Valdes in the mixed international rifle team at the 2014 Summer Youth Olympics.

Russo made her first Olympic team for Argentina as a fourteen-year-old at the 2014 Summer Youth Olympics in Nanjing, China, claiming the silver medal in shooting. In her first event, the girls' 10 m air rifle, she shot 406.9 points to finish thirteenth from a field of twenty but missed out on a chance to compete in the final. Two days later, Russo and her Mexican partner José Santos Valdes had put up a decent aim to take home the silver in the mixed international rifle team competition, losing the final match 2–10 to Hungary's István Péni and Egypt's Hadir Mekhimar.

The 2015 Pan American Games in Toronto, Ontario, Canada sought Russo a chance to prove her credentials on the world stage despite her age. Coming to the final round of the women's 10 m air rifle with a fourth-seeded score of 411.3, Russo marked a superb 204.7 to claim a silver medal in a duel against Mexico's Goretti Zumaya, who eventually walked away with a victory by just a narrow 0.1-point margin. Moreover, Russo secured a place on the Argentine team and had an opportunity to be selected for her first ever Olympics.

She competed at the 2020 Summer Olympics.

References

External links

Athlete Profile – 2015 Pan American Games

1999 births
Living people
Argentine female sport shooters
Shooters at the 2014 Summer Youth Olympics
Shooters at the 2015 Pan American Games
Pan American Games silver medalists for Argentina
Sportspeople from Córdoba, Argentina
Olympic shooters of Argentina
Shooters at the 2016 Summer Olympics
Shooters at the 2020 Summer Olympics
Pan American Games medalists in shooting
South American Games gold medalists for Argentina
South American Games medalists in shooting
Competitors at the 2018 South American Games
Shooters at the 2019 Pan American Games
Medalists at the 2015 Pan American Games
Medalists at the 2019 Pan American Games
21st-century Argentine women